was a Japanese photographer and illustrator of books for children, known for his portrayal of rural and school life. He has illustrated numerous children's books, books containing his photography, and other works. His works have won prizes, beginning with a photography prize from the Mainichi Shimbun in 1955.

He is sometimes credited as Motokazu Kumagai or Motoiti Kumagai.

Biography
His given name  is generally romanized as "Motoichi", but is also sometimes written as "Motoiti" or "Motokazu".

From 1930 to 1933, Kumagai worked as a teacher. He had his first work for children published in the May 1932 issue of the magazine Kodomo no Kuni. In 1936, he bought a Pearlette camera (a Konishiroku derivative of the Vest Pocket Kodak), with a simple meniscus lens, and started to use this to photograph village life. His first photograph collection was published two years later by Asahi Shinbunsha. 

He went to Tokyo in 1939 as a government photographer and was later sent three times to Manchukuo. After the war, he returned to teach in his village. A book of photographs of school life published by Iwanami Shoten in 1955 won a photography prize from Mainichi Shimbun.

Kumagai published books of works for children as well as books of photographs. His photographs are held in the permanent collection of the Tokyo Metropolitan Museum of Photography, and a volume of the series Nihon no Shashinka is dedicated to his work. He received various honours for his work, especially since around 1990. The village of Achi created a gallery, Kumagai Motoichi Shashin Dōgakan, for the permanent exhibition of his work. 

He died on 6 November 2010, in a nursing home in Tokyo, of natural causes.

Bibliography

As illustrator
 (Suzuki Jin Seidō, 1936)
 (Kin no Seisha, 1941)
 Kodansha, 1942)
 (Kyōyōsha, 1942)
 (Hakubunkan, 1943)
 (Sanseidō, 1943)
 (Nōsangyoson Bunka Kyōkai, 1943)
 (Miyajima Shoten, 1946)
 (Miyajima Shoten, 1947)
 (Kodansha, 1949)
 (Popura-sha, 1969)
 (Bunkendō Shichiseisha, 1969)
 (Akane Shobō, 1975)
 (Chikuma Shobō, 1975)
 (Iida Chūō Nōgyō Kyōdō Kumiai)
 (1981)
 (1982)
 (1983)
 (1984)
 (1985)
 (Kiyose-shi Kyōdo Hakubutsukan, 1985)
 (Nōsangyoson Bunka Kyōkai, 1986)
 
 
 
 ) 
 
 
 
 
 
 
 (Kyōdo Shuppansha, 1988)
 (Kyōdo Shuppansha, 1992)
 (Shinano Mainichi Shinbunsha, 1992)
 (Minami Shinshū Shinbunsha, 1993)

As illustrator and writer
 (Rironsha, 1966)
 (Fukuinkan, 1969)
Reprinted until at least as recently as 1994; later printings are )
 (Fukuinkan, 1976)
Reprint: (Fukuinkan Shoten, 1985. )
 (Shinanoji, 1980)
 (Arisukan, 1983)
 (Fukuinkan Shoten, 1985)
 (Kyōdo Shuppansha, 1994. )
 (Fuzanbō Intānashonaru, 2005. )
 (Shin'yōsha, 2007. )

As photographer
 (Asahi Shinbunsha, 1938)
Reprint (Kumagai Motoichi Shashin-hozon-kai, 1985)
 (Iwanami Shoten, 1953)
Reprint (Iwanami Shoten, 1988)
 (Iwanami Shoten, 1954)
Reprint (Iwanami Shoten, 1988)
 (Iwanami Shoten, 1955)
Reprint (Iwanami Shoten, 2007)
 (Shinano-ji, 1975)
 (Iwanami Shoten, 1989. , as photographer and writer)
 (JCII, 1992, no ISBN)
 (Kōbundō, 1993. )
 (Kyōdo Shuppansha, 1994)
 
 
 
 
 (Iwanami Shoten, 1997)
 (Kiyose-shi, 1999)
 (Issōsha Shuppan, 2008. )

Other
 (Shinhyōronsha, 1954)
2nd edition (Shinhyōronsha, 1956)
 (Ie-no-Hikari Kyōkai, 1961)
 (Shūbunsha)
 (1967)
 (1968)
 (1969)
 (1969)
 (1972)
 (Ie-no-Hikari Kyōkai, 1968)
 (Minami Shinshū Shinbunsha Shuppankyoku, 1996)
 (Kawade Shobō Shinsha, 2001, as writer)
 (Kumagai Motoichi to Ichinensei no Kai, 2001, no ISBN)
 (Minami Shinshū Shinbunsha Shuppankyoku, 2003, no ISBN)
 (Kumagai Motoichi Shashin Dōgakan, 2003, no ISBN)
 (Nōsangyoson Bunka Kyōkai, 2005. , as illustrator and photographer)
 (Seikyūsha, 2005. )

Awards and recognition

Mainichi Shimbun photography prize (1955)

Notes

References

External links
Website of the Kumagai gallery 

Japanese photographers
Japanese children's book illustrators
People from Nagano Prefecture
1909 births
2010 deaths
Japanese centenarians
Men centenarians